Amable Charles Franquet, comte de Franqueville (1 January 1840 – 28 December 1919) was a French conseiller d'État, lawyer, and scholar, known for his work on British institutions.

Life 
The only child of the French engineer Alfred Charles Ernest Franquet, comte de Franqueville, he followed in his steps and joined the Conseil d'État, rising to the rank of conseiller d'État.

Franquet was created a hereditary Papal count in 1870 by Pope Pius IX. He was also an Officer of the Legion of Honour.

He was elected to the Académie des sciences morales et politiques in 1888 and became a corresponding fellow of the British Academy in 1904. In 1901, he received an honorary LL.D. from the University of Glasgow.

He died at the Château de la Muette in 1919.

Family 
In 1903, he married Lady Sophia Matilda Selborne, third child of Roundell Palmer, 1st Earl of Selborne.

Works 

 Commentaire de la loi du 16 septembre 1807 sur le dessèchement des marais, in-8°, 134 pages. Paris. Thunot, 1860
 Étude sur les sociétés de secours mutuels en Angleterre, in-8°, 52 pages. Paris, P. Dupont, 1863
 Les Institutions politiques, judiciaires et administratives de l'Angleterre, 1863
 Études sur les sociétés de secours mutuels d'Angleterre, 1863
 Les Écoles publiques en Angleterre, 1869
 Du Régime des travaux publics en Angleterre : rapport adressé à M. le ministre des Travaux publics, 4 vol., 1874 
 Le Gouvernement et le parlement britanniques, 3 vol., 1887
 Rapport sur le prix Le Dissez de Penanrun, 1889
 Le Système judiciaire de la Grande-Bretagne, 2 vol., 1893
 La Justice criminelle en France et en Angleterre, 1894
 L'Institut de France : son origine, ses transformations, son organisation, 1895
 Le Premier siècle de l'Institut de France : 25 octobre 1795-25 octobre 1895, 2 vol., 1895-1896
 Marie de Franqueville, sœur Sainte-Catherine de Sienne au Tiers-Ordre de saint Dominique, 1844-1900, 1903
 Histoire de Bourbilly, 1907
 Le Château de La Muette, 1915
 Lady Sophia Palmer, comtesse de Franqueville (1852-1915), 1917
 Souvenirs 1840-1919, 1922

References 

Conseil d'État (France)
Lawyers from Paris
Civil servants from Paris
Papal counts
French nobility
French essayists
Corresponding Fellows of the British Academy
Officiers of the Légion d'honneur
French jurists
1840 births
1919 deaths